In baseball statistics, walk-to-strikeout ratio (BB/K) is a measure of a hitter's plate discipline and knowledge of the strike zone. Generally, a hitter with a good walk-to-strikeout ratio must exhibit enough patience at the plate to refrain from swinging at bad pitches and take a base on balls, but he must also have the ability to recognize pitches within the strike zone and avoid striking out. Joe Morgan and Wade Boggs are two examples of hitters with a good walk-to-strikeout ratio. A hit by pitch is not counted statistically as a walk and therefore not counted in the walk-to-strikeout ratio.

The inverse of this, the strikeout-to-walk ratio, is used to compare pitchers.

Leaders
Best single-season walk-to-strikeout ratios from 1913 to 2011:

In 2018, Jose Ramirez had the best BB/K ratio in the major leagues, at 1.33.

References

See also
 On-base percentage 
 Walk percentage

Batting statistics